Diary of a Pilgrimage is a novel by Jerome K. Jerome published in 1891. It tells of a trip undertaken by Jerome and his friend "B" to see the Oberammergau Passion Play in Germany.

Itinerary
They travel by train from London Victoria to Dover and have a rough overnight crossing of the English Channel to Ostend and thence by train to Cologne where they spend a night in a hotel. The following day they visit Cologne Cathedral before catching the train to Munich, travelling alongside the Rhine. They spend Sunday in Munich where Jerome practices his German before catching a train to Oberau and then a carriage to Oberammergau to see the play. They return via Heidelberg.

Asides
As well as describing the journey and the characters they meet the book also contains a number of humorous asides including :
"The Question of Luggage" - conflicting advice on what to pack for the trip
"A Playful Boat" - the effects of seasickness
"The German Bed"
"The German Railway Guard"
"We Seek Breakfast" - an attempt to order a savoury omelette
"A Faithful Bradshaw"
"The Difficulty of Dining to Music"

External links

Publication history from the Jerome K. Jerome Society
 

1891 British novels
Novels by Jerome K. Jerome
Victorian novels
British comedy novels
Novels set in Germany
British travel books
Henry Holt and Company books
J. W. Arrowsmith books
English non-fiction books